Grinjan is a settlement south of Koper in the Littoral region of Slovenia.

References

External links
Grinjan on Geopedia

Populated places in the City Municipality of Koper